Wojciech Ziemba (15 October 1941 – 21 April 2021) was a Polish Roman Catholic archbishop.

Ziemba was born in Poland and was ordained to the priesthood in 1967. He served as titular bishop of Falerone and was the auxiliary bishop of the Roman Catholic Archdiocese of Warmia, Poland from 1982 to 1992. He then served as bishop of the Roman Catholic Diocese of Elk from 1992 to 2000 and as archbishop of the Roman Catholic Archdiocese of Bialystok, Poland, from 2000 to 2006 and as archbishop of the Archdiocese of Warnia from 2006 to 2016.

Notes

1941 births
2021 deaths
20th-century Roman Catholic bishops in Poland
21st-century Roman Catholic archbishops in Poland
People from Mielec County